The Kenya women's national field hockey team represents Kenya in international field hockey competitions.

Tournament record

African Games
1995 – 
1999 – 
2003 – 
 2023 – Qualified

Africa Cup of Nations
1990 – 
1998 – 
2013 – 
2017 – 4th
2022 –

African Olympic Qualifier
2007 – 
2011 – 
2015 – 
2019 – 4th place

Commonwealth Games
 2022 – 9th

Hockey World League
2014–15 – 35th
2016–17 – Round 1

See also
Kenya men's national field hockey team

References

External links
FIH profile

African women's national field hockey teams
Field hockey
National team